Wayne Edward Yates (November 7, 1937August 16, 2022) was an American professional basketball player who played 37 games for the Los Angeles Lakers in one National Basketball Association (NBA) season in 1961–62.  He later worked as a college basketball coach, most notably at Memphis State University (now the University of Memphis).

Early life
Yates was born in Gurdon, Arkansas, on November 7, 1937.  He attended North Little Rock High School in nearby North Little Rock, and played basketball for its school team.  He initially studied at New Mexico State University (NMSU), where he played for the Aggies and received first team all-Border Conference honors as a sophomore in 1957–58.  After two years at NMSU, he transferred to Memphis State University.  He consequently sat out the 1958–59 season per NCAA transfer rules, before averaging 5.3 points and 4.0 rebounds per game with the Memphis Tigers during his junior year.  He then led the team with 17.5 points and 14.4 rebounds as a senior, and helped the Tigers to a berth in the 1961 National Invitation Tournament.  At the end of the season, Yates earned first-team All-America honors from The New York Times, as well as an honorable mention from Converse.

Professional career
After finishing his college career at Memphis State, Yates was selected in the first round (fifth overall selection) of the 1961 NBA Draft by the Los Angeles Lakers.  He made his NBA debut on October 27, 1961, recording one rebound and attempting one field goal against the Detroit Pistons.  He ultimately played only one season in the NBA, backing up All-Star Rudy LaRusso in 1961–62 NBA season.  He averaged 1.9 points and 2.5 rebounds in 37 games in a season shortened by injury.  In the offseason, he was traded to the Saint Louis Hawks for future draft picks.

Instead of reporting to the Hawks, Yates signed with the Oakland Oaks of the fledgeling American Basketball League.  While Yates found a productive role with the team, averaging 10.7 points and 8.7 rebounds per game, the league folded before the season ended.  He was subsequently invited to the New York Knicks training camp prior to the 1963–64 NBA season.  However, he did not make the team.

Coaching career
Yates returned to his alma mater, Memphis State, as an assistant to head coach Moe Iba in 1969.  When Iba was dismissed in 1970, new coach Gene Bartow retained Yates as an assistant.  Yates helped Memphis State to their first Final Four, as the upstart Tigers made it all the way to the 1973 NCAA tournament final, losing to UCLA.  After one more season, Bartow left for Illinois and Yates was elevated to head coach.

The young coach had a successful tenure at Memphis State, leading the Tigers to three straight postseason appearances and four straight 19+ win seasons.  However, a subpar 1978–79 season, allegations of NCAA violations, and the academic suspension of Tigers star Tony Rufus all led to Yates announcing his resignation on February 8, 1979.  He was eventually replaced by Dana Kirk at the conclusion of the season.  His final record in five seasons at Memphis was 111–49.

After a year off from coaching, Yates was named head coach at Northwestern Louisiana (now Northwestern State University) in 1980.  He coached there for five seasons, finishing with a 48–67 record at the school.  Yates resigned following a 3–25 season in 1984–85.

Personal life
Yates was married to Harriet Ardala "Dala" Harding Yates until her death.  Together, they had four children.

Yates died on August 16, 2022, in Natchitoches, Louisiana.  He was 84 years old.

Head coaching record
Source:

References

External links
 

1937 births
2022 deaths
American men's basketball players
Basketball coaches from Arkansas
Basketball players from Arkansas
Centers (basketball)
College men's basketball head coaches in the United States
Los Angeles Lakers draft picks
Los Angeles Lakers players
Memphis Tigers men's basketball coaches
Memphis Tigers men's basketball players
New Mexico State Aggies men's basketball players
Northwestern State Demons basketball coaches
Oakland Oaks players
People from North Little Rock, Arkansas